Corsocasis coronias is a moth in the family Schreckensteiniidae. It was described by Edward Meyrick in 1912.

References

Schreckensteinioidea
Moths described in 1912